The blockade of Barcelona, from August to December 1808, was the failed attempt by Spanish troops to recapture the French occupied Barcelona during the Peninsular War.

Background
The French under Guillaume Philibert Duhesme had occupied Barcelona on 29 February 1808.

In the Dos de Mayo Uprising in Madrid, citizens revolted against the French on 2 May 1808, and three days later, pressure from Napoleon forced Ferdinand VII of Spain to return the crown to his father, who handed it over to Napoleon who, in turn handed it over to his brother Joseph Bonaparte on 10 May.

But Spanish-occupied Girona kept on blocking the connection from Barcelona to Perpignan in France as Duhesme besieged Girona on 20–21 June 1808 unsuccessfully and on 24 July–16 August, his second siege of Girona failed again.

Blockade
Meanwhile on 23 July, one day before the start of the second siege of Girona, the Marquis of Del Palacio landed at Tarragona at the head of a division of regular Spanish troops. French Barcelona was defended by only 3,500 Swiss and Italian remaining troops under the command of General Lecchi. On 31 July the last of the French outposts, the castle of Mongat, surrendered and the blockade of Barcelona started. After the failed second siege of Gerona, Duhesme returned to Barcelona on 20 August and the blockade turned into a siege.

Relief
On 5 November, General St. Cyr with his troops, now 23,680 strong, was marching towards Barcelona. His siege of Roses, from 7 November to 5 December 1808, ended with a French victory.

The decisive Battle of Cardadeu on 16 December 1808 ended with a French victory. On 21 December, St. Cyr defeated the Spanish at the Battle of Molins de Rei, driving the Catalan army away from Barcelona.

See also
 Wikisource:1911 Encyclopædia Britannica/Peninsular War
 Sieges of Barcelona (801–1808)
 War of the Spanish Succession

Notes

References

External links
 Guerra de la Independencia
 

Military history of Barcelona
Battles of the Napoleonic Wars
Battles involving France
Battles involving Spain
Battles involving the United Kingdom
Battles in Catalonia
Conflicts in 1808
1808 in Spain
December 1808 events